Chila is a mountain in the Andes of Peru, about  high. It lies in the Arequipa Region, Castilla Province, Choco District, and in the Caylloma Province, Caylloma District. Chila is situated southeast of the lake Llocococha (possibly from in the Quechua spelling Lluk'uqucha).

References 

Mountains of Peru
Mountains of Arequipa Region